WBCG (98.9 FM) is a radio station licensed to Murdock, Florida. Owned by iHeartMedia, Inc., the station broadcasts a classic rock music format branded as "BIG 98.9", syndicated from iHeartMedia, Inc.'s Premium Choice network.

History
The station was assigned the call sign WHHD on November 2, 1998. On November 26, 2001, the station changed its call sign to the current WBCG.

On May 5, 2014, the station re-branded from "Beach 98.9" to "98.9 MyFM", maintaining its hot adult contemporary format.

On October 7, 2019, the station changed its format to contemporary Christian music as "UP! 98.9".

On August 1, 2022, the station changed its format again to classic rock music as "BIG 98.9".

References

External links

BCG
Radio stations established in 1998
1998 establishments in Florida
IHeartMedia radio stations
Classic rock radio stations in the United States